Kavčič is a surname. Notable people with the surname include:

Blaž Kavčič (born 1987), Slovenian tennis player
Blaž Kavčič (politician) (born 1951), Slovenian politician and economist
Stane Kavčič (1919–1987), Slovenian politician
Tine Kavčič (born 1994), Slovenian footballer
Tomaž Kavčič (born 1953), Slovenian footballer and manager

Slovene-language surnames